Duke Zhao of Jin (died 526 BC) was from 531 to 526 BC the ruler of the State of Jin, a major power during the Spring and Autumn period of ancient China. His ancestral name was Ji, given name Yi, and Duke Zhao was his posthumous title.  He succeeded his father, Duke Ping of Jin, who died in 532 BC.

Duke Zhao of Jin reigned for 6 years and died in 526 BC.  During his reign the state was increasingly dominated by the six powerful clans: Han, Zhao, Wei, Fan, Zhonghang, and Zhi.  He was succeeded by his son, Duke Qing of Jin.

References

Year of birth unknown
Monarchs of Jin (Chinese state)
6th-century BC Chinese monarchs
526 BC deaths